Nocoleche Station now known as Nocoleche Nature Reserve was a pastoral lease that operated as both a sheep station and a cattle station in outback New South Wales.

In 1894 the station was carrying approximately 110,000 sheep.

One of the early managers was Walter Gamson who ran Nocoleche from 1870 until his death in 1898 and also was superintendent for Frederick Armytage's properties in Victoria, New South Wales, and Queensland.

A Company, the Australian Sheep Farms Limited, with directors including Sir Arthur Stanley, R. H. Caird and G. Slade raised £400,000 in capital to acquire Toorale, Dunlop and Nocoleche Stations in 1925. By 1927 the condition of the property had deteriorated and cattle were introduced, portion of the station had also been resumed by the Government.

An auction was held at Nocoleche in 1966 with three blocks offered. The Treweeke family owned the property from 1928, the property had grazed an average of 30,000 sheep and 700 cattle producing an average of 800 bales of wool and producing 8,000 lambs since 1960.

The property was left to the grandchildren of owner George Treweeke. His grandson John Peken bought the interests of the others in 1974, and lived there with his family until 1978, when the property was bought by National Parks and became Nocoleche Nature Reserve.

See also
List of ranches and stations
Nocoleche Nature Reserve

References

Stations (Australian agriculture)
Pastoral leases in New South Wales
1978 disestablishments in Australia